McDonald Harawa (born 25 December 1992) is a Malawian football goalkeeper who currently plays for Moyale Barracks.

References

1992 births
Living people
Malawian footballers
Malawi international footballers
Nyasa Big Bullets FC players
Moyale Barracks FC players
Association football goalkeepers